Helga Mühlberg-Ulze is an East German sprint canoeist who competed in the early to mid-1960s. She won three medals at the ICF Canoe Sprint World Championships with a gold (K-2 500 m: 1966), and two bronzes (K-4 500 m: 1963, 1966). Ulze retired at the end of the 1968 season and afterwards focussed on youth development work.

References

East German female canoeists
ICF Canoe Sprint World Championships medalists in kayak
Living people
Year of birth missing (living people)